"¡Ay Carmela!" is one of the most famous songs of the Spanish Republican troops during the Spanish Civil War.

It had originally been a nineteenth century folk song, El Paso del Ebro, commemorating the routing of Napoleonic troops across the river Ebro in 1807, during the War of Independence.

During the Spanish Civil War, in common with many older folk songs, the melody was reused with new lyrics by the Republican side, in various versions (El Ejército del Ebro, El paso del Ebro,  ¡Ay, Carmela!, ¡Ay, Manuela!, Rumba la Rumba, and Viva la XV Brigada). A less well-known version was also coined by Nationalists (El Rîo del Nervión).

Variants
The most popular lyrics to this Republican song have two variants known as El Paso del Ebro and Viva la XV Brigada. The first one is related to the Battle of the Ebro and the second mentions the Battle of Jarama, two of the main confrontations of the Civil War.

The sentence Luchamos contra los moros (We fight against the Moors) refers to the Regulares, the feared Moroccan units fighting as the shock troops of the Nationalists.

A Croatian singer and songwriter Darko Rundek released a version of the song with anti-fascist and anti-oppressor lyrics in his 2000 album U širokom svijetu. The song enjoyed widespread support among populations in the Serbian capital of Belgrade, especially during the 2018–2020 Serbian protests.

Lyrics

Viva la Quince Brigada

See also

 Si me quieres escribir, another Republican song mentioning the crossing of the Ebro River
 Songs of the Spanish Civil War

References

External links 
Miguel Ángel Gómez Naharro - Song ¡Ay Carmela! with lyrics
Ay, Carmela! y la Batalla del Ebro

Songs of the Spanish Civil War
Spanish-language songs
Anti-fascist music
Second Spanish Republic
Spanish anthems
1930s songs
Songwriter unknown